Snakeheads are Chinese gangs that smuggle people to other countries. They are found in the Fujian region of China and smuggle their customers into wealthier Western countries such as those in Western Europe, North America, Australia, and some nearby wealthier regions such as Taiwan and Japan.

Snakeheads use various methods to get their customers to the West. They may employ the use of stolen or altered passports, improperly obtained visas, and bribes to move people from nation to nation until they arrive at their final destination.
They also may use fake business delegations and tour groups as a way of beating immigration controls. The rate of payment for successful smuggling can be as high as US$70,000.

One notable snakehead member was Cheng Chui Ping or "Sister Ping". Another is Guo Liang Chi, known mainly by his street name of Ah Kay, who was the mastermind of the Golden Venture cargo ship tragedy in 1993 that was financed by Sister Ping.

Role in defection from North Korea

A North Korean emigrant seeking to enter South Korea may turn to a snakehead gang to be voluntarily smuggled out of North Korea. If the emigrant is unable to pay the snakeheads back, the emigrant may risk becoming a victim of human trafficking.

In popular culture

 In the Lincoln Rhyme novel The Stone Monkey by Jeffery Deaver, the villain is a shadowy snakehead, nicknamed "the Ghost," who is intent on killing a family of Chinese immigrants who are the only witnesses alive who can identify him to the authorities.
 The Alex Rider novel Snakehead by Anthony Horowitz is the seventh novel in the series, in which Alex must infiltrate a Snakehead gang for ASIS (Australian Secret Intelligence Service). 
 In the video game Grand Theft Auto: San Andreas, one of the operations puts the player on a ship carrying illegal Vietnamese immigrants. The gangster running the operation is referred to as "The Snakehead". This gang is known as the "Da Nang Boys". The operation is a direct allusion to the Golden Venture fiasco in 1993.
 In the "Laughing Magician" story arc of the comic book Hellblazer, John Constantine enlists the aid of a snakehead gang boss.
 The 1980 Shaw Brothers production Lost Souls directed by Mou Tun Fei concerns the exploitation of illegal immigrants and features a gang of nasty snakeheads as the villains.
 The Oregon Files novels Dark Watch and Flood Tide by Clive Cussler features snakeheads as minor villains.
 The Fringe episode "Snakehead" features a gang that smuggles immune-boosting parasites by feeding them to the Chinese immigrants that they are transporting.
 In an episode of Law & Order: Special Victims Unit called "Debt", the detectives fight against a snakehead gang.
 The TV series Hawaii Five-0 (2010) featured a snakehead in the pilot episode who is sentenced to life imprisonment – later to be revealed as a subordinate of the archvillain Wo Fat.
 The zombie fiction novel World War Z by Max Brooks features a Snakehead gang member as a character, revealing how they helped transport infected refugees outside mainland China to the West and Central Asia.
 The movie Premium Rush refers to the snakehead gang as the recipient of the envelope that is being delivered.
The main antagonists in the 1998 movie Lethal Weapon 4 are members of a Snakehead gang which is found to be smuggling Chinese people into the United States and exploiting them.

References

External links
 List of prices paid to human smugglers by immigrants from China and other countries.

 

Asian-American gangs
Chinese-American gangs
Gangs in Asia
Illegal immigration
Organized crime gangs
Organized crime groups in China
Organized crime groups in the United States